According to Greek law every Sunday of the year is a public holiday. In addition, there are nine mandatory, official public holidays: New Year's Day, 6 January, 25 March, Orthodox Easter Monday, 1 May, 15 August, 28 October, 25 December and 26 December. There are, however, more public holidays celebrated in Greece than are announced by the Ministry of Labour each year as mandatory. The list of these non-fixed National Holidays rarely changes and has not changed in recent decades, giving a total of twelve National Holidays each year.

A public holiday that occurs on a Sunday is not transferred to another date, with the exception of 1 May, which is regarded by the locals more as a general strike than a public holiday.

In addition to the national holidays, some public holidays that are not celebrated nationwide, but only by a specific professional group or a local community. For example, many municipalities have a patron Saint also called 'Name Day' or a Liberation Day, and at this day it is customary for schools to have a day off.

National holidays

Profession-specific holidays

Bibliography
 Tomkinson, John L. Festive Greece: A Calendar of Tradition''. Athens: Anagnosis, 2003, 
 Τ.Ε.Ι. Σερρών, Τμήμα Λογιστικής

External links
List of the various days envisaged as non-working days pursuant to Regulation (EEC, Euratom) No 1182/71 of 3 June 1971 

 
Greece
Events in Greece
Labour in Greece
Holidays